{{Infobox television
| image                =
| image_upright        = 
| image_size           = 
| image_alt            = 
| caption              = 
| alt_name             = 
| genre                = TelenovelaMedical drama
| creator              = 
| based_on             = {{based on|Nip/Tuck|Ryan Murphy}}
| developer            = 
| writer               = 
| screenplay           = 
| story                = 
| director             = 
| creative_director    = 
| starring             = 
| narrated             = 
| theme_music_composer = 
| opentheme            = 
| endtheme             = 
| composer             = 
| language             = Spanish
| num_seasons          = 1
| num_episodes         = 58
| list_episodes        = 
| executive_producer   = 
| producer             = 
| news_editor          = 
| location             = 
| cinematography       = 
| editor               = 
| camera               = 
| runtime              = 
| company              = 
| distributor          = 
| network              = 
| picture_format       = HDTV 720p
| audio_format         = Stereophonic sound
| first_aired          = 
| last_aired           = 
| related              = Nip/Tuck 
}}Mentiras perfectas is a drama television series that premiered on Caracol Televisión on October 28, 2013, and concluded on January 24, 2014. Created by Caracol Televisión in co-production with Warner Bros. Entertainment and Teleamazonas. The series is based on the American drama Nip/Tuck'' created by Ryan Murphy, and it stars Carolina Gómez, Emmanuel Esparza and Michel Brown.

Cast 
 Carolina Gómez as Julia Pombo
 Emmanuel Esparza as Cristóbal Alzate
 Michel Brown as Santiago Ucrós
 Javier Ramírez Espinosa es Matías Ucrós 
 Manuela González as Catalina Uribe
 Natasha Klauss as Alicia María Rivera
 Andrea López as Kimberly Jones
 Ana María Kamper as Gloria de Arciniegas
 Paola Turbay as Susana Lara
 Róbinson Díaz as Mario Quintero
 Laura Ramos as Johana Cruz
 Norma Nivia as Carla Mojica
 Miguel González as Nelson
 Cristian Ruiz as Sergio "Yeyo" Gonzáles Lara
 Laura Torres as Lucía

References 

2013 Colombian television series debuts
2014 Colombian television series endings
Colombian drama television series
Ecuadorian drama television series
Spanish-language television shows
Caracol Televisión original programming
Colombian television series based on American television series
Television series by Warner Bros. Television Studios
Television shows set in Colombia
Medical television series
Teleamazonas original programming